Lucknow Super Giants is a franchise cricket team based in Lucknow, Uttar Pradesh. They play in the Indian Premier League (IPL). The Lucknow franchise formed in 2021. Sanjeev Goenka is its principal owner. The team is captained by KL Rahul and coached by Andy Flower. The team mentor is Gautam Gambhir. In its debut season, Lucknow Super Giants qualified for the play-offs.

The team is owned by RPSG Group, who previously owned the Rising Pune Supergiant franchise between 2016 and 2017. This team is expected to play its home matches at the BRSABV Ekana Cricket Stadium in Lucknow.

Franchise history 
The Governing Council of the Indian Premier League issued an invitation to tender for two new sides in August 2021. A total of 22 companies declared an interest, but with a high base price for the new teams, there were no more than six serious bidders. The Board of Control for Cricket in India allowed a consortium of three companies or individuals to bid for each franchise. The Sanjiv Goenka-owned RPSG Group won the rights to operate the Lucknow franchise with a bid of 7,090 crores.

The team launched a competition to decide its name, from which the name Lucknow Super Giants was chosen in January 2022. Ahead of the IPL 2022 mega auction, the franchise drafted KL Rahul as their captain for ₹17 crore, making him the joint highest paid player in the league. The franchise also bought Marcus Stoinis and Ravi Bishnoi. The team unveiled their jersey on 23 March 2022 for the upcoming season.

Team history

2022 IPL Season: debut season of the team 

At the mega auction which was held in February 2022, the team brought many players in which the all-rounders were more in numbers. The franchise brought various big international players such as Quinton de Kock, Mark Wood, Krunal Pandya, Marcus Stoinis. Later the franchise named KL Rahul as the captain of the team and the old Zimbabwean cricketer Andy Flower as the head coach for the upcoming season. Franchise also appointed Gautam Gambhir as the mentor of the team. In the initial phase of the season all-rounder Marcus Stoinis was not available due to ongoing Australian series in another country. Before the start of the season, it was confirmed that the English pace bowler Mark Wood will not be able to join the team because of injury so, the franchise drafted Australian bowler Andrew Tye in the place of Mark to fill the requirement of pace bowler in the team in the first season.

In its first season of IPL, LSG finished third in the table which meant they qualified for the playoffs. They faced fourth place Royal Challengers Bangalore in the Eliminator Match and were knocked out by them at that stage.

Seasons 
The team had its excellent inaugural season of Indian Premier League. The team finished on the third place in the points table and hence qualified for the playoffs.

Result Summary

Season summary

By Opposition 

Source- Cricbuzz

Home ground 

The home ground of the team is the Bharat Ratna Shri Atal Bihari Vajpayee Ekana Cricket Stadium. The stadium was renamed from Ekana Cricket Stadium in honor of the late Atal Bihari Vajpayee, a former Indian Prime Minister. It was established in 2017. It is a stadium under public-private partnership. With a seating capacity of 50,000, it became the fifth largest international cricket stadium in India. On 6 November 2018, the stadium hosted its first international match, a Twenty20 International (T20I) between India and the West Indies, becoming the 52nd stadium in India to host an international cricket match.

In its debut season, the team was unable to play any of the matches at its home ground due to COVID-19 outbreak in India so all the league stage matches of the tournament were hosted by the Maharashtra in 2022 season.  The team is yet to play any of its match on home ground but on 22 September 2022, BCCI confirmed that the old home and away format is going to back in the league from 2023 season. So, it is expected that the team will be playing its home matches at this cricket stadium.

Kit manufacturers and sponsors

Current squad
 Players with international caps are listed in bold.

Administration and support staff

References

External links 
 

Cricket in Lucknow
Indian Premier League teams
2022 establishments in India
RPSG Group
Cricket clubs established in 2022